Bartramiales is an order of moss.

Taxonomy

The order Bartramiales contains a single family with nine genera.

Family Bartramiaceae 

Anacolia 
Bartramia 
Breutelia 
Conostomum  
Flowersia 
Leiomela 
Neosharpiella 
Philonotis  
Plagiopus

See also 
 List of plant orders

References 

 M. Menzel J. Hattori Bot. Lab. 71: 242 1992

External links 
 
 
 Bartramiales at Tropicos

 
Moss orders